The World Scrabble Championship 1991 was the first World Scrabble Championship. The winner was Peter Morris, a Canadian, representing the United States.

Plans for a World Scrabble Championship had formed as early as 1986/87. After Coleco bought Selchow and Righter, the company announced that they were interested in helping players to organize a "World-Class Open" in 1988. At the 1987 Nationals, John Williams announced that the first World Scrabble Championship would be held the following summer in New York. It would be 1991, however, before
it became a reality.

The 48 players were separated into random groups of 6 and played round robins within their groups. The top 2 players from each group then played a knockout to produce two finalists who played a best-of-three finals.

Morris and Cappelletto split their first two games then met for a final game to decide it all. On his tenth move, Cappelletto made a rare blunder by playing the phony SMAIL instead of CLAIMS. The move may have cost him the championship. As it was, Morris pulled out a complicated end game for a 4-point win and the first world title.

Complete Results

Finals
Game 1: Morris 463 - Cappelletto 349
Game 2: Cappelletto 368 - Morris 301
Game 3: Morris 371 - Cappelletto 367

References 

1991
1991 in the United Kingdom
1991 in London
Scrabble in the United Kingdom